Wendover Nugget is a hotel and casino located in West Wendover, Nevada. In addition to the Montego Bay Resort, it is located right on the border line between Utah and Nevada. There is a connecting skyway between the Nugget and the Montego Bay. Both establishments' buildings are almost directly abut the state line; their parking lots are in Utah.

History
The origins of the first building at this location dates back to 1926 when William "Bill" Smith opened up a service station and then in 1931 expanded it when gambling became legal. He then named it the Stateline Casino.
From 2002-2004 it was named the Stateline Nugget.  Then after changing ownership in 2004, the casino was renamed to what is now called the Wendover Nugget.

On August 3, 2007, two people were involved in attempting to rob the casino. One was an employee of the casino.

On October 14, 2007, Carlos Garcia-Castillijos was murdered. During a fight between him and his wife, two brothers intervened, and were suspected of killing Carlos. The two suspects in the case were apprehended by police in Utah.

References

Casino hotels
Casinos completed in 2004
Casinos in West Wendover, Nevada
Hotel buildings completed in 2004
Hotels in Nevada